Casados con hijos was the 2004 Colombian remake of U. S. situation comedy Married... with Children. It was produced by Caracol TV and Columbia Pictures subsidiary CPT Holdings.

It features the Rochas (the Colombian version of the Bundys) living in Bogotá with their neighbours, the Pachóns (the D'Arcys), using copied sets and situations from the original series, but adapted to the Colombian urban environment.

This version airs with English subtitles, weekdays in the United States on MTV Tr3́s, an American MTV network aimed at Latinos. It has also aired in Venezuela (Televen) and Ecuador (Ecuavisa).

Cast
Santiago Rodríguez as Francisco "Paco" Rocha (Al Bundy)
Lorna Paz / Lorna Cepeda as Dolores Lola de Rocha (Peg Bundy)
Jorge Marín (2005) as Jefferson (Jefferson D'Arcy)
Carlos Humberto Camacho (2004) as Óscar Pachón (Steve Rhoades)
María Isabel Henao as Amparo de Pachón (Marcy D'arcy)
Lina Luna as Kelly Rocha (Kelly Bundy)
Iván González (2004) / Miguel González (2005) as Willington "Willy" Rocha (Bud Bundy)

External links 
 Official site (archived) from Caracol TV
 
 Colarte
 Trailer from MTV Tr3́s

2000s Colombian television series
2004 Colombian television series debuts
2006 Colombian television series endings
Colombian television sitcoms
Married... with Children remakes
Television series by Sony Pictures Television
Caracol Televisión original programming
Colombian television series based on American television series
Spanish-language television shows